

Lake Poopó was a large saline lake in a shallow depression in the Altiplano Mountains in Oruro Department, Bolivia, at an altitude of approximately . Because the lake was long and wide, it made up the eastern half of the department, known as a mining region in southwest Bolivia. The lake received most of its water from the Desaguadero River, which flows from Lake Titicaca at the north end of the Altiplano.

In 2002 the lake was designated as a site for conservation under the Ramsar Convention. By December 2015, the lake had completely dried up, leaving only a few marshy areas. Although the lake has dried up completely twice in the past, it does not appear that it will recover this time. Suggested causes of the decline are the melting of the Andes glaciers and loss of their waters, because of a drought due to climate change, as well as continued diversion of water for mining and agriculture.

Archaeological evidence
Archaeological investigations conducted by the San Andrés University of La Paz, Bolivia, shows the influence of the Wankarani culture in the Poopó area. Complex central urban areas, such as villages and towns, were developed that expanded into the Poopó basin during the Late Formative period, (200 BC – 200 AD), probably in conjunction with changing patterns of agriculture. Herders and the life style of llama caravan merchants coexisted with more sedentary farmers in a harmonious system of exchange of goods and services.

Other investigators examining the following period, the Early Regional Developments ( 300 – 900 AD), have concluded that the size of the inhabited areas increased. The South Poopó inhabitants developed a unique style of ceramics style with triangular spirals. The east portion of the lake has evidence of an important Tiwanaku enclave, with ceramic styles from the core Titicaca area and surrounding styles, demonstrating the interactions between different peoples in the area.

Lake dynamics 
The main inlet of Lake Poopó (roughly 92% of the water) comes from the Desaguadero River, which enters the lake at the north end. It flows south from Lake Titicaca. There are numerous smaller inlets along the eastern shore of the lake, many of which are dry most of the year. At times of very high water levels, Poopó is connected to the salt desert Salar de Coipasa in the west. A minor outlet leads to Salar de Uyuni in the far south of the Altiplano, but as the lake lacks any major outlet, it is classified as an endorheic basin.

When the water level of Lake Titicaca is below , the flow of Desaguadero River is so low it can no longer compensate for the massive water losses due to evaporation from the surface of Lake Poopó. At this point, the lake volume begins to decrease. During the years that followed, the surface area steadily decreased until 1994, when the lake disappeared completely. The time period between 1975 and 1992 is the longest period in recent times when the lake had a continuous water body. Renewed rainfalls in the mid-1990s revitalized the lake again.

Action has been taken in order to make the area ecologically sustainable again, with the help of funding from the European Union. But the efforts have been unable to offset other changes: since 1995 regional temperatures have risen and consequently tripled the evaporation rates. In addition, water was drawn off for mining and irrigation, compounding the problems. On 20 January 2016 the area was declared a disaster zone by the Bolivian government.

Salinity and geology 

The water of Lake Poopó is highly saline. The salinity is a result of the endorheic nature of the hydrological system on the Altiplano, which allows all weathered ions to remain in the system. The salinity of Lake Poopó is further increased by the arid climate and the high evaporation from the lake surface.

In the northern end of Lake Poopó, dilution of the salinity occurs due to freshwater flow from the Desaguadero River. The salt gradient of the water increases towards the south.

The salinity varies with water volume. During October and November 2006, the salinity in the north end of the lake varied between brackish and saline (15–30,000 mg/L). In the south end of the lake the water was classified as a brine (105,000–125,000 mg/L). The water type is a 4–2 Na-(Mg)-Cl-(SO4).

Geological sources of sodium chloride (NaCl), such as halite and feldspars, are present in the drainage area. These could also contribute to the salinity of Lake Poopó. The lake body is situated on top of Cenozoic deposits, consisting mainly of unconsolidated material. These sediments are the remains of extensive prehistoric lakes, which covered the Altiplano during at least five glaciation periods.

Mining and heavy metals 
There is a long tradition of mining in the Poopó Basin. Extraction of metals was ordered in the 13th century to support the Inca army. After Spanish colonization in the 16th century, the mining operations increased in scale. At this point the region became known as one of the mining centres of Bolivia.

The mining districts are situated at the foothills of the Cordillera Oriental along the eastern border of the Poopó basin. The most important minerals to the economy are silver and tin.

Studies have shown elevated concentrations of heavy metals in surface and ground waters of the Poopó basin. These metals are naturally present in the bedrock, from which they are released through weathering processes. The mining activities in the area further contributes to the heavy metal pollution. Acid leaching from mines and mechanical processing of ore speed up the process.

The major part of the heavy metals transported to Lake Poopó seem to be immobilized in the bottom sediments. But concentrations of arsenic, lead, and cadmium in the lake water exceed Bolivian and World Health Organization guideline values for drinking water.

Flora and fauna 
There are only three fish species in the system: the native pupfish Orestias agassizii and catfish Trichomycterus rivulatus, and the introduced silverside Odontesthes bonariensis. The lake had a relatively large fish population, but by 2017 pollution and the near-complete reduction of water had all but decimated the locally important fishing industry.

The aquatic bird life was very diverse, with a total of 34 species. Most famous are the three species of flamingo (Andean, James's and Chilean), which mainly lived in the shallow lagoons in the northern and eastern parts of the lake. An inventory of the bird population, made in 2000 in cooperation with BirdLife International, identified 6 threatened species and others that are near-threatened. Among these are the Andean flamingo and the Andean condor.

A total of 17 higher plants and 3 species of algae were identified in and around Lake Poopó. Due to the constant drought and flooding, the littoral zone experiences great disturbances. As a result, there was hardly any vegetation to be found on the shores of the lake.

Effects of the loss of the lake
The sparse communities nearby have suffered culturally and financially due to the local economy being dependent on lake fishing. Moreover, many bird species native to Bolivia and internationally have been affected due to loss of food, and an annual migration area.

See also 

 Desertification
 Ouki
 Tulare Lake

References 

 Drever, James I: The Geochemistry of Natural Waters, 3rd edition, Prentice Hall, 1997.
 Montes de Oca; Geografia y Recursos Naturales de Bolivia, 3rd Edition, EDOBOL, La Paz, 1997.
 Rocha, O.O. (editor): "Diagóstico de los recursos naturales y culturales de los lagos Poopó y Uru Uru, Oruro – Bolivia". Convención Ramsar, WCS/Bolivia, La Paz, 2002.
 Troëng, B., Riera-Kilibarda C. Mapas temáticos de recursos minerales de Bolivia, Boletin del Servicio geológico de Bolivia N 7, La Paz, 1996.

External links 

Master thesis about heavy metals in the rivers of the Poopó basin
Master thesis about heavy metals in Lake Poopó
Satellite images and information from NASA about Lake Poopó
Lake Titicaca, Lake Poopó, and Salar de Uyuni, Bolivia
Bolivia Drainage
Bolivia's second-largest lake dries up and may be gone forever, lost to climate change – The Guardian
Google Earth view

Lakes of Oruro Department
Endorheic lakes of South America
Saline lakes of South America
Archaeological cultures of South America
Ramsar sites in Bolivia
Former lakes of South America
Altiplano